Diane Vaughan is an American sociologist and professor at Columbia University. She is known for her work on organizational and management issues, in particular in the case of the space shuttle Challenger Disaster.

In the understanding of safety and risk, Vaughan is perhaps best known for coining the phrase "normalization of deviance", which she has used to explain the sociological causes of the Challenger and Columbia disasters. Vaughan defines this as a process where a clearly unsafe practice comes to be considered normal if it does not immediately cause a catastrophe: "a long incubation period [before a final disaster] with early warning signs that were either misinterpreted, ignored or missed completely."

In the study of relationships, Vaughan is known for her research into the process of relationship breakups.

Vaughan received her Ph.D. in sociology from Ohio State University and is a laureate of the Public Understanding of Sociology Award, of the American Sociological Association. The Challenger Launch Decision won the Rachel Carson Prize (inaugural winner) and the Robert K. Merton Award as well as being nominated for the Pulitzer Prize and National Book Award.

Bibliography 
 Controlling Unlawful Organizational Behavior (1983).
 Uncoupling. Turning Points in Intimate Relationships (1986), Oxford University Press.
 The Challenger Launch Decision: Risky Technology, Culture and Deviance at NASA (1996), Chicago: University of Chicago Press.

See also

 Elephant in the room
 Groupthink

References

External links
 Faculty bio
 :Wikibooks:Professionalism/Diane Vaughan and the normalization of deviance

American sociologists
American women sociologists
Columbia University faculty
Living people
Year of birth missing (living people)
21st-century American women
Ohio State University alumni